Pickled Eggs and Sherbet is the sole album by the English electronic group All Seeing I. The album reached No. 45 on the UK Albums Chart.

Track listing
"Walk like a Panther" (featuring Tony Christie)
"No Return"
"Beat Goes On"
"Sweet Music"
"Mary"
"1st Man in Space" (featuring Philip Oakey)
"Drive Safely Darlin'"
"Stars on Sunday"
"Big Pecker"
"I Walk"
"I Pejulater"
"Nicola"
"Plastic Diamond"
"Dirty Girl"
"Airy Armpits"

Personnel

All Seeing I 
 Dean Honer - keyboards, programming, production
 Jason Buckle - guitars, bass, production
 Richard Barrett (DJ Parrot) - drums, programming, production

Vocalists
 Tony Christie ("Walk Like a Panther", "Nicola")
 Jarvis Cocker ("Drive Safely Darlin")
 Philip Oakey ("1st Man in Space")
 Stephen Jones ("Plastic Diamond")

References

1999 debut albums